Martina Navratilova and Pam Shriver were the defending champions and successfully defended their title, defeating Claudia Kohde-Kilsch and Helena Suková in the final 4–6, 6–2, 6–2. This was their 8th successive Grand Slam title in women's doubles.

Seeds

Draw

Finals

Top half

Section 1

Section 2

Bottom half

Section 3

Section 4

References
1985 French Open – Women's draws and results at the International Tennis Federation

Women's Doubles
French Open by year – Women's doubles
1985 in women's tennis
1985 in French women's sport